This list covers television programs whose first letter (excluding "the") of the title is M.

M

MA
MacGyver (1985)
MacGyver (2016)
Mack & Moxy
Mac Miller and the Most Dope Family
Mad
Mad About You
Mad Men
Mad TV
Madam Secretary
Made
Made for Love
Made in Chelsea (UK)
Madeline
Maggie (UK, 1981)
Maggie (U.S., 1981)
Maggie (U.S., 1998)
Maggie and The Ferocious Beast
The Magic Hour
The Magic Roundabout
The Magic School Bus
Magical Girl Site (Japan)
The Magician (France)
The Magician (US) 
The Magicians (UK)
The Magicians (US)
The Magnificent Seven
Magnum, P.I. (1980)
Magnum, P.I. (2018)
Mahou Sentai Magiranger
Maid Sama!
Maisie Raine
Maji de Watashi ni Koishinasai!
Major Dad
Majority Rules!
Make the Grade
Make It or Break It
Make It Pop
Make Room for Daddy
Make Way for Noddy
Makin' It (sitcom)
Making It (reality competition series)
Making a Murderer
Making Fiends
Making the Band
Making the Video
Malcolm in the Middle
Malibu Country
Malu Mulher (Brazil)
Mama Mirabelle's Home Movies
Mama's Family
Man About the House
 The Man and the Challenge
 The Man and the City
Man from Atlantis
The Man from U.N.C.L.E.
Man in a Suitcase
Man with a Plan
Man Seeking Woman
The Man Show
Man of the World
Man v. Food
Man vs. Wild
Manhattan
Manhattan Love Story
Manhunt (1959)
Manhunt (1969)
Manhunt (2001)
Manhunt (2004)
Maniac Mansion
Manifest
Manimal
Mannix
MANswers
The Many Loves of Dobie Gillis
Manzo'd with Children
Marcus Welby, M.D.
Mariah's World
Mark Twain
Mark Wright's Hollywood Nights (British)
Marlon
Marriage Boot Camp
Married... with Children
Married by America
Married to the Army: Alaska
Married at First Sight (Australia)
Married at First Sight (UK)
Married at First Sight (US)
Married to Jonas
Married to Medicine
Married to Medicine: Houston
Married to Rock
Marry Him If You Dare (South Korea)
Marshall Law
The Martha Stewart Show
Martha Speaks
Martial Law
Martin
Martin Kane, Private Eye
Marvin Marvin
Martin Mystery
Marvin the Tap-Dancing Horse
The Marvelous Misadventures of Flapjack
The Marvelous Mrs. Maisel
Mary (1978)
Mary (1985)
Mary Hartman, Mary Hartman
Mary + Jane
Mary Kay and Johnny
Mary, Mungo and Midge (British)
The Mary Tyler Moore Hour
The Mary Tyler Moore Show
Masha And The Bear
 The Masked Dancer
Masked Singer
King of Mask Singer (South Korea)
The Masked Singer (US)
Masquerade
Masquerade Party
M*A*S*H
M.A.S.K. (Mobile Armored Strike Kommand)
Master of None
MasterChef (UK)
MasterChef (US)
MasterChef Australia
MasterChef Canada
MasterChef Junior
MasterChef USA
Mastermind (UK)
Masterminds (Canada)
Masterminds (US)
Masterpiece Theatre
Masters of Horror
Masters of the Maze
Masters of Sex
Match Game
Match Game-Hollywood Squares Hour
Match of the Day (British)
Maternidade
Matlock
Matt Hatter Chronicles
Matt Houston
Maude
Maury
Maverick
Max Headroom
Maxie's World
Max & Shred
The Maxx
Mayberry R.F.D.
May to December (British)
The Mayor
Max & Ruby
Maya & Miguel
Maya the Bee

MC
McCloud
McHale's Navy
The McLaughlin Group
McLeod's Daughters
McMillan & Wife
McMorris & McMorris

ME
Me and My Monsters
Meatballs and Spaghetti
Me, Myself & I
Mech-X4
Medical Center
Medical Examiner Dr. Qin (China)
Medical Investigation
Medici
Medium
Meerkat Manor
Meet the Browns
Meet Millie
Meet the Peetes
Meet the Press (Australia)
Meet the Press (US)
MegaMan NT Warrior
Mega Babies
Mega Man
Mega Man: Fully Charged
Megan Wants a Millionaire
Megas XLR
Megyn Kelly Today
Melissa & Joey
Melody Rules
Melrose Place (1992)
Melrose Place (2009)
Men Behaving Badly
Men in Trees
Men With Brooms
Men, Women & Dogs
The Mentalist
The Meredith Vieira Show
Merlin
The Merv Griffin Show
Metal Mickey
Metalocalypse
Method & Red
Mew Mew Power
Mexico's Next Top Model

MI
Miami Ink
Miami Social
Miami Vice
The Michael J. Fox Show
The Mick
Mickey Mouse
The Mickey Mouse Club
Mickey Mouse Clubhouse
Mickey Mouse Works
Mickey and the Roadster Racers
Mickey Spillane's Mike Hammer
The Middle
The Middleman
@midnight
Midnight Caller
The Midnight Special
Midnight, Texas
Midsomer Murders
Miffy's Adventures Big and Small
The Mighty B!
The Mighty Boosh
Mighty Ducks
Mighty Express (Canada)
Mighty Machines
Mighty Magiswords
Mighty Max
Mighty Med
Mighty Mike
Mighty Morphin Power Rangers
Mighty Morphin Alien Rangers
Mike the Knight
Mike Tyson Mysteries
Mike & Mike
Mike & Molly
Mike, Lu, and Og
Miles from Tomorrowland
Millennium
A Million Little Things
Milo Murphy's Law
The Millionaire
The Millionaire Matchmaker
Million Dollar Listing Los Angeles
Million Dollar Listing Miami
Million Dollar Listing New York
Million Dollar Listing San Francisco
Million Dollar Minute (Australia)
Million Dollar Quartet
The Million Second Quiz
The Milton Berle Show
Minder
Mind Field
Mindhunter
Mind Your Language
Minx
The Mindy Project
Minga y Petraca (Puerto Rico)
Ministry Of Mayhem
Minnie's Bow-Toons
Minute to Win It
Minute to Win It (US)
Miraculous: Tales of Ladybug & Cat Noir
Mirada de mujer, el regreso (Mexico)
Miranda
The Misadventures of Sheriff Lobo (later Lobo)
Mira, Royal Detective
Misfits
 Misfits of Science
 Miss BG
Miss Fisher's Murder Mysteries
Miss Marple
Miss Match
 Miss Moon (France) 
Miss Spider's Sunny Patch Friends
Mission: Impossible
The Mist (2017)
Mister Ed
Mister Maker
Mister Peepers
Mister Roberts
Mister Rogers' Neighborhood
Mister Terrific
Mistresses (UK)
Mistresses (US)
Mixels
Mix Master
Mix Master: Final Force
Mixology
Miyuki
Miz & Mrs.

MM
MMA Live

MO
The Mob Doctor
Mobile Suit Gundam
Mobile Suit Gundam 0083: Stardust Memory
Mobile Suit Gundam ZZ
Mobile Suit Victory Gundam
Mobile Suit Zeta Gundam
Mobsters
Mob Wives
Mob Wives Chicago
Mob Wives: The Sit Down
Model Squad
Models Inc.
Modern Marvels
Modern Men
Modern Family
The Mod Squad
Moesha
The Mole
Molly of Denali
Mom
Mom’s Got Game
Mona the Vampire
Monday Night Baseball
Monday Night Countdown
Monday Night Football
Monica the Medium
Monk
Monk Little Dog
Monkey
The Monkees
Monopoly
The Monroes (1966)
The Monroes (1995)
MonstersMonsters at WorkMonsters vs. AliensMonster AllergyMonster Buster ClubMonster GarageMonsterQuestThe Montel Williams ShowMonty Python's Flying CircusMoon KnightMoonlightMoonlightingMoon UnitMork & MindyMortal Kombat: ConquestMost HauntedMost Haunted Live!Mother Up!Motherland: Fort SalemMotive (Canada)MotorSport Ranch (TV series)The Mothers-in-LawMoving UpMozart in the JungleMRMr. Adams and EveMr. BeanMr. Bean: The Animated SeriesMr. BelvedereMr Ben (British)Mr. D (Canada)Mr. MagooMr. MeatyThe Mr. Men ShowMr. MercedesMr. & Mrs. SmithMr. NovakThe Mr. Peabody & Sherman ShowMr. PersonalityMr. RobotThe Mr. Science ShowMr SelfridgeMr Shalash's FamilyMr. ShowMr. Sloane (UK)Mr. SunshineMr. Wizard's WorldMr. YoungMrs. Eastwood & Company MS 

 Ms. MarvelMTMTV CribsMTV UnpluggedMTV's The 70s HouseMU¡Mucha Lucha!MudpitMujer, Casos de la Vida Real (Mexico)Mukta (India)The MulletsMulti-Coloured Swap Shop (UK)The MunstersMuppet Babies (1984-2001)Muppet Babies (2018-)The Muppet ShowMuppets TonightMurder, She WroteMurphy BrownMusic CityMusic FeedThe Musketeers (BBC)Must Love KidsMutant XMutt & StuffMXMXCMYMy Babysitter's a Vampire (Canada)My Big Fat American Gypsy WeddingMy Big Fat Fabulous LifeMy Big Fat Greek LifeMy Big Fat Gypsy WeddingMy Big Fat Obnoxious BossMy Big Fat Obnoxious FianceMy Big Redneck WeddingMy BoysMy Brother and MeMy Dad the Rock StarMy Fab 40thMy Fair BradyMy FamilyMy Family's Got GutsMy Favorite HusbandMy Favorite MartianMy Friend FlickaMy Friend RabbitMy Friends Tigger & PoohMy Gym Partner's a MonkeyMy Hero AcademiaMy House, Your MoneyMy Kitchen Rules (Australia)My Kitchen Rules (US)My Kitchen Rules NZ (New Zealand)
 My Knight and MeMy Life as a Teenage RobotMy Life MeMy Little PonyMy Little Pony: Friendship Is MagicMy Lottery Dream HomeMy Mother the CarMy Name Is EarlMy Pet MonsterMy Secret IdentityMy Sister EileenMy Sister SamMy So-Called LifeMy Strange AddictionMy Super Sweet 16My Teen Romantic Comedy SNAFUMy Three SonsMy Two DadsMy Wife and KidsMy World and Welcome to ItMysteries at the CastleMysteries at the HotelMysteries at the MonumentMysteries at the MuseumMysteries at the National ParksThe Mysterious Benedict SocietyThe Mysterious Cities of Gold (1982)The Mysterious Cities of Gold (2012)The Mysteries of LauraMysterious WaysMystery DiagnosisMystery DinersMystery GirlsMystery HuntersMysteryQuestMystery Science Theater 3000MythBustersMythBusters: The SearchMysticons''
Previous:  List of television programs: K-L    Next:  List of television programs: N